= Ten Motives =

UK electronic cigarette company

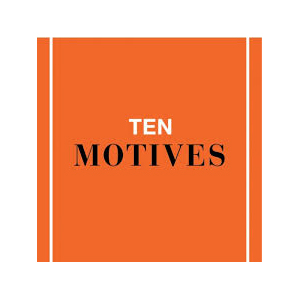

Ten Motives is a British electronic cigarette brand owned by British American Tobacco.

== History ==
The Ten Motives company in Cheshire was founded by Art Devlin who, with Tony Jones, was the controlling shareholder.

In 2016 the company was taken over by British American Tobacco.

== Controversies ==
In 2014, their advertising was ruled inaccurate due to it claiming it to be "the healthier smoking alternative" to smoking.
